The 2005 World Rally Championship was the 33rd season in the FIA World Rally Championship. The season began on January 21 with the Monte-Carlo Rally and ended on November 13 with the Rally Australia.

In the drivers' world championship, Citroën Total's Sébastien Loeb successfully defended his title, finishing a record 56 points ahead of Subaru's Petter Solberg and Peugeot's Marcus Grönholm. Loeb also set several other records during the season. He won ten world rallies, beating the previous record of six held by him (2004) and Didier Auriol (1992). He also took six consecutive wins, beating Timo Salonen's 20-year-old record of four. Peugeot's Markko Märtin retired after his co-driver Michael Park was fatally injured in their crash at the Wales Rally GB.

Citroën took the manufacturers' title for the third year in a row, well ahead of Subaru and Ford. PSA Peugeot Citroën still went ahead with their plan to withdraw both Citroën and Peugeot from the series at the end of the season - although Citroën's departure later became a sabbatical as they spent the following year developing a new car for 2007. More blows to manufacturer involvement in the series followed when Mitsubishi and Škoda announced the withdrawal of their factory teams. However, the 2006 season would see Citroën and Škoda continue as the semi-works teams Kronos Citroën and Red Bull Škoda Team, respectively.

The video game WRC: Rally Evolved was based on this season.

Regulation changes
Drivers' and co-drivers' helmets are now required to be equipped with a HANS device.

Calendar

The 2005 championship was contested over sixteen rounds in Europe, North America, Asia, South America and Oceania.

Teams and drivers

World Rally Championship entries

JWRC Entries

PWRC entries

Results and standings

Drivers' championship

Manufacturers' championship

JWRC Drivers' championship

Events

Notes
 Sébastien Loeb secured the drivers' championship title in Japan.
 Citroën secured the manufacturers' championship in Spain.

External links

 FIA World Rally Championship 2005 at ewrc-results.com
2005 season at World Rally Archive

World Rally Championship
World Rally Championship seasons